Gergana Topalova (born 22 February 2000) is a Bulgarian tennis player.

Topalova has career-high WTA rankings of No. 308 in singles and No. 388 in doubles. She has won five singles titles and three doubles titles on the ITF Circuit.

On the ITF Junior Circuit, Topalova has a career-high combined ranking of 31, achieved on 22 January 2018.

Professional career
Topalova made her Fed Cup debut for Bulgaria in 2019.

On 23 November 2022, she was confirmed as a participant at the 2023 United Cup as part of the Bulgarian team. She made her debut in mixed doubles match alongside  
Adrian Andreev which they lost to the top-seeded team of Maria Sakkari and Stefanos Tsitsipas. The following day, she lost her singles match to Elise Mertens in three sets. 

In January 2023, Gergana made her WTA Tour debut in the qualifying draw of the Hobart International. She entered as an alternate and lost in the first round to Diane Parry.

ITF Circuit finals

Singles: 6 (5 titles, 1 runner-up)

Doubles: 11 (3 titles, 8 runner-ups)

ITF Junior Circuit finals

Singles (4–3)

Doubles (2–3)

National participation

Fed Cup/Billie Jean King Cup
Gergana Topalova debuted in Bulgaria Fed Cup team in 2019; since then she has accumulated a 0–0 singles win–loss record and a 0–2 doubles record (0–2 overall).

Doubles (0–2)

United Cup

Singles (0–1)

Doubles (0–1)

References

External links
 
 
 

2000 births
Living people
Bulgarian female tennis players
Sportspeople from Plovdiv
Sportspeople from Sofia